The 6G7 series or Cyclone V6 engine is a series of V6 piston engines from Mitsubishi Motors. Five displacement variants were produced from 1986 to 2021, with both SOHC and DOHC, naturally aspirated and turbo charged layouts. While MIVEC variable valve timing has also been implemented in some versions the 2.5, 3.0 and 3.5 L versions were also available with gasoline direct injection. This engine has been the flagship powerplant of the company except when they briefly built a V8 in 1999–2001. The staple of their high-end sedans, it was given twin-turbos for the Mitsubishi GTO, and became the most powerful car ever built by the company at the time.

Bore and Stroke

6G71
It was installed with two valves per cylinder, and used Mitsubishi's ECI-Multi multiple port fuel injection fuel delivery system. The compression ratio was 8.9:1.

A supercharger was installed and exclusive to the Debonair. The compression ratio for the supercharged model is 8.0:1. The 6G71 engine was also converted to run on LPG, a version which was only available to the Debonair and mainly intended for commercial (taxi) use.

Applications
 1986–1990 Mitsubishi Galant
 1986–1992 Mitsubishi Debonair
 1990–1992 Mitsubishi Diamante/Mitsubishi Sigma

6G72
The 6G72 was manufactured in three different models which featured SOHC with 12-valves, SOHC  with 24-valve, and DOHC with 24-valves.

The latest version was used in the Mitsubishi Eclipse GT and Galant.

The turbocharged variant had the lowest compression ratio at 8.0:1, with each bank of the V6 having its own independent turbocharger and intercooler. Turbo chargers were built by Mitsubishi.

Applications
 1986–1992 Mitsubishi Debonair
 1987–2000 Dodge Caravan/Plymouth Voyager
 1988–1989 Chrysler New Yorker
 1988–1990 Dodge Raider
 1988–1990 Mitsubishi Sigma
 1988–1993 Dodge Dynasty
 1988–2021 Mitsubishi Pajero (a.k.a. Montero/Shogun) (Except GCC and Oceania now)
 1989–1995 Dodge Spirit/Plymouth Acclaim/Chrysler Saratoga
 1990 Chrysler Town & Country (early 1989 production only)
 1990–1991 Chrysler TC by Maserati
 1990–1993 Dodge Daytona
 1990–1993 Dodge Ram 50
 1990–1995 Chrysler LeBaron
 1990–1996 Mitsubishi Mighty Max
 1990–1998 Hyundai Sonata
 1990–1999 Mitsubishi GTO (a.k.a. Mitsubishi 3000GT, Dodge Stealth)
 1990–2002 Mitsubishi Diamante
 1990–2006 Mitsubishi L200
 1991–1996 Dodge Stealth
 1991–1996 Mitsubishi Verada (Australia)
 1992–1994 Dodge Shadow/Plymouth Sundance
 1993–2001 Mitsubishi Magna (Australia)
 1994–2007 Mitsubishi Delica
 1997–2007 Mitsubishi Pajero Sport (a.k.a. Montero Sport/aka Challenger in Australia)
 1999–2003 Mitsubishi Galant
 1991-1999 Mitsubishi 3000GT
 2000–2005 Mitsubishi Eclipse
 2001–2005 Dodge Stratus/Chrysler Sebring Coupe
 2008–2011 Dodge Caravan (China)/Chrysler Grand Voyager (China)

6G73
The 6G73 is a 24-valve SOHC design with two valves running off a single cam lobe on the exhaust valves using a forked rocker arm and each intake valve actuated with two cam lobes, with a smaller bore than the 3.0 liter version of the same block. The engine has low-profile cast aluminum heads which help it to fit into compact engine bays, while pent-roof combustion chambers increase efficiency and make room for four valves per cylinder, arranged in a cross-flow pattern with a "tumble" intake port for both strong breathing and low emissions. Spark plugs are centered in the combustion chambers. The SOHC 24 valve version of the 6G72 uses these same cylinder heads. A toothed timing belt is used.

Applications

 1990–2002 Mitsubishi Diamante
 1993–1996 Mitsubishi Galant
 1995–2000 Chrysler Cirrus
 1995–2000 Chrysler Sebring
 1995–2000 Dodge Stratus
 1995–2000 Dodge Avenger

6G74
The 6G74 is a 24-valve unit available with either SOHC, DOHC, or MIVEC DOHC. It uses Multi-port fuel injection and uses forged steel connecting rods.

The gasoline direct injection version of the 6G74 was launched in April 1997 as the first GDI V6 engine ever produced. It differed from the basic 6G74 in many ways apart from its unique fuel injection system — it had a crown-curved rather than flat piston head, upright intake ports rather than angled, and a 10.4:1 rather than 10.0:1 compression ratio. Mitsubishi claimed 30 percent better fuel economy, a 30 percent reduction in emissions, and higher power outputs than diesels.

Applications
 1992–1998 Mitsubishi Debonair (Japan )
 1993–2021 Mitsubishi Pajero (a.k.a. Montero/Shogun)(Only available in GCC area now)
 1997–2004 Mitsubishi Diamante
 1999–2001 Mitsubishi Proudia
 1999–2004 Mitsubishi Montero Sport
 1999–2005 Mitsubishi Magna/Verada
 1999–2011 Mitsubishi Pajero Sport/Mitsubishi Challenger
 2005–2015 Mitsubishi L200/L200 Sportero (Japan, General Countries)
 2008–2015 Mitsubishi Triton (Japan Domestic, Thailand, Brazil and Middle East)

6G75
In the interest of durability, the pistons are high-pressure castings attached to forged steel connecting rods that swing from a heat-treated forged steel crankshaft. Intended to be used with 95 RON fuel, lower octane fuels will be detected by the vehicle's knock sensors, and the engine detuned to compensate.

Specifications
 Engine Type: V type, single overhead camshaft
 Bore x stroke: 
 Displacement: 
 Combustion chamber: pentroof type
 Compression ratio: 10.5:1 (MIVEC), 10:1 (Non MIVEC) 
 Firing order: sequential 1-2-3-4-5-6
 Lubrication system: Pressure feed, full-flow filtration
 Lash adjusters on intake and exhaust
 Fuel delivery system: Electronically controlled MFI
Fuel grade: Factory-tuned for 95 RON unleaded petrol
 Ignition system: Electronically controlled 6-coil (non-distributor)
 Lubrication system: Pressure feed, full-flow filtration
 oil pump type: Trochoid type

Applications
 2003–2021 Mitsubishi Pajero/Montero
 2004–2011 Mitsubishi Endeavor
 2004–2009 Mitsubishi Galant
 2005–2008 Mitsubishi 380
 2006–2012 Mitsubishi Eclipse

See also

 List of Mitsubishi engines
 List of engines used in Chrysler products
 Hyundai Sigma engine

References

6G7
V6 engines

5. https://media.mitsubishicars.com/channels/2004-Galant/releases/d8fa6a4a-5172-57cd-7b04-a59f4b06fbf0
Gasoline engines by model